Gjerpen is a former township which is now part of the municipality of Skien, in Telemark county, Norway.

Location
The parish of Gjerpen was established as a municipality January 1, 1838 (see formannskapsdistrikt). According to the 1835 census the municipality had a population of 4,381. Gjerpen was located east of the city of Skien. It encompassed districts such as Borgestad, Bøle, Gulset and Luksefjell. On 1 July 1916 an area with roughly 1,332 inhabitants was moved to Skien, and on 1 July 1920 an area with 437 inhabitants was moved to Porsgrunn.

On 1 January 1964 the rest of Gjerpen was incorporated into Skien, along with Solum and the district Valebø. Prior to the merger Gjerpen had a population of 15,300. The current district of Gjerpen constitute only a small part of the former Gjerpen municipality.

Etymology
The municipality (originally the parish) is named after the farm Gjerpen (Old Norse Gerpin, from *Garpvin), since the first church was built there. The meaning of the first element is unknown, the last element is vin f 'meadow'.

History

Gjerpen Church (Gjerpen Kirke) is one of the oldest churches in Norway, dating from around the year 1150. Vidkun Quisling was buried in the Gjerpen cemetery.

Mæla Manor (Mæla gård i Gjerpen) was the residence of merchant Diderich von Cappelen (1734–1794) and his first wife Petronelle Pedersdatter Juel (1737–1785). It was the childhood home of their sons Ulrich Fredrich von Cappelen, Diderik von Cappelen and 
Peder von Cappelen. The former manor house is now operated as an auction facility (Nye Store Mæla Gård Auktion).

Fossum Ironworks (Fossum Jernverk), which was in operation from 1539 from 1869, was last owned by the Løvenskiold family. Løvenskiold-Vækerø, which is one of Norway's largest forest owners, owns and manages the large forest estate which formerly belonged to the Fossum Ironworks

References

Other sources

Former municipalities of Norway